Egor Degtyarev is a Russian swimmer. At the 2012 Summer Olympics, he competed in the Men's 400 metre freestyle, finishing in 20th place in the heats, failing to reach the final.

References

Russian male swimmers
Year of birth missing (living people)
Living people
Olympic swimmers of Russia
Swimmers at the 2012 Summer Olympics
Russian male freestyle swimmers
20th-century Russian people
21st-century Russian people